The 2000–01 Segunda Divisão season was the 67th season of the competition and the 51st season of recognised third-tier football in Portugal.

Overview
The league was contested by 59 teams in 3 divisions with UD Oliveirense, Moreirense FC and Portimonense SC winning the respective divisional competitions and gaining promotion to the Liga de Honra.  The overall championship was won by Moreirense FC.

League standings

Segunda Divisão – Zona Norte

Segunda Divisão – Zona Centro

Segunda Divisão – Zona Sul

Footnotes

External links
 Portuguese Division Two «B» – footballzz.co.uk

Portuguese Second Division seasons
Port
3